Jimi Weikko Tauriainen (born 9 March 2004) is a Finnish professional footballer currently playing as a midfielder or forward for Chelsea.

Club career
Born in Helsinki, Tauriainen began his footballing career with academy side FC Wild, a club his father had helped create, at the age of five. He joined professional outfit HJK in 2016, before trialling with Italian sides Juventus and Inter Milan, as well as English side Chelsea in 2020.

In March 2020, shortly after his sixteenth birthday, HJK announced on their website that Tauriainen would join Chelsea in July of the same year, following his successful trial. Initially a forward during his time in Finland, he was converted to a midfielder at Chelsea.

He signed his first professional contract with The Blues on his seventeenth birthday, before extending this contract four months later, in July 2021.

International career
Tauriainen has represented Finland from under-15 to under-19 level.

Personal life
Tauriainen hails from a footballing family; his father, Pasi, was an international for Finland, while his brother, Julius, currently plays for the reserve team of Polish side Miedź Legnica. His uncles, Kimmo and Vesa, were also footballers.

Career statistics

Club

References

2004 births
Living people
Footballers from Helsinki
Finnish footballers
Finland youth international footballers
Association football midfielders
Association football forwards
Helsingin Jalkapalloklubi players
Chelsea F.C. players
Finnish expatriate footballers
Finnish expatriate sportspeople in England
Expatriate footballers in England